(5 July 1951 – 22 August 2013), known primarily by the stage name  was a Japanese  singer and actress. She had success in Japan in the 1960s and 1970s with her ballad-type songs. She was married on-and-off with Utada Teruzane, and was the mother of Japanese pop singer Hikaru Utada.

Life and career
Fuji (sometimes credited as Keiko Fujita) was born in Iwate Prefecture, where her father was a  singer. Her mother was a  player . As a child, Fuji sometimes accompanied her parents and sang with them when they were on tour. Her song "Keiko no Yume wa Yoru Hiraku" (Keiko's version of "Yume wa Yoru Hiraku") won the Mass Popularity Award at the Japan Record Awards in 1970. She also performed this song in the 21st Kōhaku Uta Gassen New Year's Eve TV special.

Her debut album, released 5 March 1970, topped the Oricon album chart for 20 consecutive weeks, and her next album , released 5 July 1970, continued topping that chart for 17 consecutive weeks. She topped the Oricon album chart for a 37 consecutive weeks, an incredible record in Japan's music history. Her debut album's number-one record of 20 consecutive weeks remains the longest consecutive number-one record in Oricon history.

She married the  singer Kiyoshi Maekawa and retired from singing in 1979, announcing her retirement during a TV show on 30 December of that year. The marriage ended in divorce, after which she emigrated to the United States, where she became active in music again by 1981. There, she married Teruzane Utada, a record producer. Their only child, Hikaru Utada, was born in 1983 in New York City (and later themselves became a record-setting pop star in Japan by her late teens). The couple married and divorced seven times.

2006 confiscation of money by the DEA 
On 3 March 2006, U.S. DEA officials confiscated more than $420,000 in American, Canadian, and Australian currencies from Keiko Fuji's carry-on luggage at JFK Airport, New York, as she waited to board a flight to Las Vegas. Keiko denied any wrongdoing, and was not charged with any crime. However, the government initiated forfeiture proceedings, seeking to seize the money, which it alleged represented proceeds of drug sales or was intended to be used to buy drugs.

Keiko disputed the government's claim. In August 2008, the matter remained pending in Federal District Court in New York. On 27 January 2009, the Federal District Court in New York ordered the confiscated money returned to her, citing lack of evidence.

Death
Keiko Fuji died on 22 August 2013 after jumping from the thirteenth floor of a condominium building in Shinjuku, Tokyo. No foul play was suspected. Her body was found in the grounds of her apartment building. Police said that her slippers were found at the end of her balcony, with no suicide note found. However, her child Hikaru Utada claims there was a suicide note.

Discography

Like U3
For U3 discography see Hikaru Utada discography

Solo

LPs
 Shinjuku no Onna / "Enka no Hoshi" Fuji Keiko no Subete – 5 March 1970
 Onna no Blues – 5 July 1970
 Utaitsugarete 25-nen Fuji Keiko Enka o Utau – 5 December 1970
 Saihate no Onna – 5 March 1971
 Keiko no Jinsei Gekijō  – 5 July 1971
 Fuji Keiko Recital – 5 October 1971
 Keiko no Warabeuta – 25 December 1971
 Shiranai Machi de – 25 December 1971
 Fuji Keiko On Stage – 25 May 1972
 Wakare no Tabi – 25 June 1972
 Original Golden Hits Collection – 5 August 1972
 Tōkuheikitai / "Enka no Tabi" – 5 December 1972

CDs
 Fuji Keiko Densetsu no Meikyoku – 21 October 1999
 Kiite Kudasai Watashi no Jinsei: Fuji Keiko Collection – 20 December 2000
 Fuji Keiko Complete Single Collection: 15-nen no Kiseki – 21 September 2005
 Golden Best Fuji Keiko – 26 October 2005
 Super Best – 11 December 2005
 Golden Best Fuji Keiko Hit & Cover Collection Enka(艶歌) to Enka(縁歌) – 8 December 2010

Singles
 "Shinjuku no Onna" (25 September 1969)
 "Onna no Blues" (5 February 1970, Oricon number 1)
 "Keiko no Yume wa Yoru Hiraku" (25 April 1970, cover of "Yume wa Yoru Hiraku" by En Mari, Oricon number 1)
 "Inochi Azukemasu" (25 July 1970)
 "Onna wa Koi ni Ikiteiku" (25 October 1970)
 "Sai Hate no Onna" (5 February 1971)
 "Koi Jingi" (5 May 1971)
 "Michinoku Kouta" (5 June 1971)
 "Ai no Junrei " (5 July 1971)
 "Shiranai Machi de " (25 October 1971)
 "Kyōto kara Hakata made" (25 January 1972)
 "Wakare no Tabi" (25 May 1972)
 "Hana wa Nagarete" (25 September 1972)
 "Kanashimi no Machi" (5 December 1972)
 "Ashita kara Watashi wa" (25 March 1973)
 "Hana Kouta" (July 1973)
 "Henreki " (25 August 1973)
 "Koi no Yuki wa Risō " (5 November 1973)
 "Kyoto Blues" (5 April 1974)
 "Hi no kuni Kouta" (June 1974)
 "Watashi wa Kyōto e Kaerimasu" (5 July 1974)
 "Inochi Bi" (25 August 1974)
 "Anata no Uwasa " (January 1975)
 "Ikiteru dake no Onna" (25 April 1975)
 "Sasurai" (September 1975)
 "Hashigo zake" (5 November 1975)
 "Onna dakara" (25 April 1976)
 "Kiite Kudasai Watashi no Jinsei" (25 August 1976)
 "Aishū Sakaba " (5 February 1977)
 "Anata Hitosuji" (25 June 1977)
 "Omokage Heiya" (5 November 1977)
 "Ginza Nagare-uta" (May 1978)
 "Yoi-yoi Sakaba" (October 1978)
 "Kita no Minatomati" (March 1979)
 "Kawaii Onna " (October 1979)
 "Hotaru Bi" (October 1981)
 "Aitsu ga Warui " (1984)
 "Chōyo Hanayo to" (October 1984)
 "Tokyo Meiro" (June 1986)
 "Shinjuku Banka" (25 February 1987)
 "Tabiji" (1988)
 "Shinchi no Ame" feat. Katsurasanshi (February 1989)
 "Sake ni You hodo" (April 1994)
 "Tengoku" (August 1996)
 "Tsumetai Tsuki – Nakanaide" with Cubic U (September 1996)
 "Sennen no Kagaribi" (October 1996)
 "Otoko to Onna" (October 1997)
 "Oya Ko Bune" (13 February 2014)

Select filmography

Movies
 Eiga Sakariba Nagashi-uta Shinjuku no Onna (1970, Nikkatsu)
 Zubekō Banchō Yume wa Yoru Hiraku (1970, Toei Company)
 Namida no Nagashi-uta Inochi Azukemasu (1970, Shochiku)
 Joshi Gakuen Yabai Sotsugyō (1970, Nikkatsu)
 Fuji Keiko waga Uta no aru Kagiri (1971, Shochiku)

Television
 Gozonji Kinsan Torimonochō "Shibai no Inochi Hi" (Episode 16, 1974, Nihon Educational Television/NET)
 Furimuku na Tsurukichi "Kantsubaki" (Episode 16, second part, 1975, NHK)
 Ikiteru dake no Kyōaku (Chapter 41-story license the second series of ruthless, NET, 1975)
 Hyōteki (Ryōko Ogura, 1979, KTV)
 Shin-kaikyō Monogatari (1981, TV Asahi)
 Nichiyō Emi Gekijō "Sabushiro no The Hatarake Kōgyō" (1986/1987, ABC)

Kōhaku Uta Gassen Appearances

References

External links
 

1951 births
2013 deaths
2013 suicides
20th-century Japanese actresses
Enka singers
Hikaru Utada
Japanese women pop singers
Japanese film actresses
Japanese television actresses
RCA Records artists
Sony Music Entertainment Japan artists
Suicides by jumping in Japan
Victor Entertainment artists
Musicians from Iwate Prefecture
Actors from Iwate Prefecture
People from Ichinoseki, Iwate